Southwark is a district of London, England.

Southwark may also refer to:

 Southwark, Philadelphia, U.S.
 Southwark, the former name of part of the Adelaide suburb Thebarton, South Australia
 Southwark beer, from the Southwark Brewery

See also

 Borough of Southwark (disambiguation)
 Anglican Diocese of Southwark, London
 Anglican Bishop of Southwark
 Roman Catholic Archdiocese of Southwark, London
 Archbishop of Southwark